Moser-Roth is a brand of German chocolate produced by Storck for Aldi.

History
The Moser-Roth brand name has been transferred several times to different companies.

The original Roth company was founded in 1841, in Stuttgart by pastry chef Wilhelm Roth Jr. In 1876 Roth retired from the company and the small factory was taken over by Wilhelm Wagner and Kommerzienrat Sproesser. In 1881 the company moved to larger premises.

In 1896 the company merged with its Stuttgart competitor E. O. Moser & Cie, which had been founded in 1846 by master confectioner  (1818–1878).

The brand name Moser-Roth was registered in 1902 and the company had the largest chocolate factory in Stuttgart in the 20th century, employing as many as 550 people in about 1910. Other chocolate companies in Stuttgart at the time included , Haller, Waldbaur, Schoko-Buck, Friedel, and Alfred Ritter GmbH & Co. KG, of which only the last is still in existence. Eszet is now made by Sarotti.

Early in 1942 the company was shut down for political reasons by the German Nazi Party. In September 1944, the entire factory burned down in an air raid.

Karl Haller of Stuttgart acquired the Moser-Roth brand name in 1947 and in 1948 resumed production in the Obertürkheim section of the city. After his death the Haller company was acquired by Melitta; chocolate production continued until 1967, after which the Moser-Roth brand name passed through various owners, being finally sold to Storck. Since June 2007 Storck has produced chocolate for Aldi at Moser-Roth GmbH, located in the Berlin borough of Reinickendorf. Moser-Roth is Aldi's premium brand of chocolate; it received an award from the German Agricultural Society in 2007.

References

Further reading
Lämmle, August (1941). Rückblick zum 100jährigen Bestehen der Firma Moser-Roth deren Geschäftsfreunden gewidmet, 1841–1941. Stuttgart: Stäble & Friedel. pdf at Untertuerkheim.de. .

Aldi
German chocolate companies
Food and drink companies established in 1841
August Storck brands
Brand name chocolate
Economy of Stuttgart
1841 establishments in Germany